Women in Prison is an American television sitcom created by Katherine Green which aired on Fox from October 11, 1987 to February 20, 1988.

Synopsis
Set in cell-block J of the Bass Women's prison in Wisconsin, the show focuses on the interactions among the prison inmates. The show's cast include Peggy Cass, Julia Campbell, Antoinette Byron, Blake Clark, Denny Dillon, C. C. H. Pounder, and Wendie Jo Sperber.

Campbell stars as Vicki Springer, an overachieving yuppie, who was brought to Bass Women's Prison for supposedly shoplifting (she had been actually framed on the charge by her scheming no-good husband), where she had to deal with the inmates.  Eve Shipley (Cass) was the old lady prisoner, having been there for almost 10 years and was kind of the old hand prisoner, helping others get used to the routine; Dawn Murphy (Pounder) was a bad tempered African-American woman who had murdered her abusive husband; and Bonnie Harper (Byron) was in for prostitution.

Vickie, Eve, Dawn and Bonnie all shared a cell, while, in a nearby cell of her own, complete with computer access, was Pam (Sperber), who was, not surprisingly, in prison for computer fraud.  They all had to contend with guard Meg Bando (Dillon), who didn't like the prisoners, and vice versa, and the assistant warden, Clint Rafferty (Clark), for whom Vicki worked as a secretary (for her prison job) and to whom he was attracted.

Only thirteen episodes of the series were produced and aired.

Cast
Julia Campbell as Vicki Springer
Blake Clark as Clint Rafferty 
C. C. H. Pounder as Dawn Murphy
Peggy Cass as Eve Shipley
Antoinette Byron as Bonnie Harper
Denny Dillon as Meg Bando
Wendie Jo Sperber as Pam

Episode list

See also

References

External links
 

1987 American television series debuts
1988 American television series endings
1980s American sitcoms
American LGBT-related sitcoms
1980s American LGBT-related comedy television series
English-language television shows
Fox Broadcasting Company original programming
Lesbian-related television shows
American prison television series
Television series by Sony Pictures Television
Imprisonment and detention of women
Television shows set in Wisconsin
1980s prison television series